Libušnje is a small village in the Municipality of Kobarid in the Littoral region of Slovenia.

Churches

The local church, dedicated to the Holy Spirit, was originally built in 1753, and rebuilt in the second half of the 19th century. Its ceiling was painted by Ivan Grohar.

Another local church is built on a small hill outside the village and is dedicated to Saint Lawrence. It is a Baroque church from the mid-18th century. The Slovene poet Simon Gregorčič is buried in the adjacent cemetery.

References

External links

Libušnje on Geopedia

Populated places in the Municipality of Kobarid